Bursting Out is a 2010 Nigerian drama film directed by Desmond Elliot, and starring Majid Michel, Genevieve Nnaji & Desmond Elliot. It premièred at Odeon Cinema, Greenwich, London on 29 October 2010.

Cast
Genevieve Nnaji as Zara Williams
Majid Michel as Tyrone
Desmond Elliot as 
Susan Peters as Ebiere
Omoni Oboli as Ini
Nse Ikpe Etim as Tina
Uti Nwachukwu
Ime Bishop Imoh as Daniel

Reception
Nollywood Reinvented gave it a 3-star rating and commented on the predictability of the ending of the film, because of its genre. Nollywood Forever agreed that the plot was formulaic, but gave the film a 76% rating because of the high quality of the production values, cinematography, and acting.

See also
 List of Nigerian films of 2010

References

External links

2010 films
2010 drama films
Ghanaian drama films
Nigerian drama films
2010s English-language films
English-language Ghanaian films
English-language Nigerian films